Two ships of the United States Navy have been named Araner  for one who hails from the Aran Islands.

 , was a wooden-hulled auxiliary ketch named Faith built in 1926 and acquired by the Navy on 27 January 1942.
 , was the liberty ship Juan de Fuca acquired by the Navy on 23 September 1945.

References
 

United States Navy ship names